Events of the year 2019 in Vietnam.

Incumbents
Party General Secretary & President: Nguyễn Phú Trọng
Prime Minister: Nguyễn Xuân Phúc
Assembly Chairperson: Nguyễn Thị Kim Ngân

Events 

 27–28 February – Vietnam held the second summit meeting between the leaders of the United States and North Korea.

Births

Deaths

April
 April 22 – Lê Đức Anh, 4th President of Vietnam (b. 1920)

May
 May 20 – Nguyễn Quảng Tuân, Vietnamese writer and poet (b. 1925)

July
 July 14 – Hoàng Tụy, Vietnamese mathematician (b. 1927)

References

 
2010s in Vietnam
Vietnam
Vietnam
Years of the 21st century in Vietnam